Crișan is a commune in Tulcea County, Northern Dobruja, Romania. It includes three villages: Caraorman  Crișan  and Mila 23 

At the 2011 census, 52.1% of inhabitants were Romanians, 26.2% Russians or Lipovans and 21.6% Ukrainians. At the 2002 census, 74.8% were Romanian Orthodox and 25% Lipovan Old-Rite Orthodox.

References

Communes in Tulcea County
Localities in Northern Dobruja
Ukrainian communities in Romania